Patrick Sean Lacey (born 16 March 1993) is an English footballer who plays as a midfielder for Warrington Rylands 1906. He played in the Football League for Accrington Stanley. He is also a boxer.

Football career

Early career
Lacey started his career in the academy of Tranmere Rovers, before joining Manchester United, where he played alongside players such as Ravel Morrison and Jesse Lingard. After a month with Manchester United, he was given the chance to join Liverpool, the club he had supported as a child, and took up this offer.

Professional
In July 2011 he joined Bradford City on a one-year deal following his release from Sheffield Wednesday, during his time at Bradford he had loan spells at Southport and Vauxhall Motors, after failing to break into first team he left the club.

In July 2016 he joined Accrington Stanley on a one-year deal. In August 2016 he made his debut for Stanley in the EFL Cup against Burnley coming off the bench in the 83rd minute for Billy Kee. He made his league debut for them against Morecambe coming off the bench in the 82nd minute for Shay McCartan. He scored his first goal for Accrington in a 1–0 win over Portsmouth on 17 September 2016.

Lacey's contract with Accrington was terminated on 5 May 2017 after he admitted a breach of anti-doping regulations. He had been given a 14-month ban by the Football Association having tested positive for benzoylecgonine, a metabolite of cocaine, following a game against Hartlepool United the previous November.

One month after his contract was terminated, Lacey was arrested at Glastonbury Festival in possession of 20.3 grams of cocaine, 16.8 grams of MDMA, and £520 in counterfeit £20 notes. He pleaded guilty to two counts of possessing a controlled substance, and passing as genuine an item which he knew to be a counterfeit. In July 2017 he was sentenced to 16 months in prison.

Following his release from prison, on 14 January 2019 it was confirmed that Lacey had joined Southport on an 18-month contract.

In January 2020 he joined Stalybridge Celtic. Lacey joined Chester in September 2020. After suffering a knee injury, in February 2021 he raised funds for surgery. On 15 February 2022, it was announced that Lacey had decided to leave Chester in order to take up an offer with an unnamed Northern Premier League club. On 16 February 2022, Lacey signed for Northern Premier League Division One West side Warrington Rylands 1906 on a short-term deal until the end of the 2021–22 season.

Boxing career
Lacey has also fought as a professional boxer, alongside his semi-professional football career and his day job as a carpet fitter.

Personal life
Lacey’s brothers, Luis and Shea are also footballers, playing for Barnsley and Manchester United, respectively.

References

External links
 
 

1993 births
Living people
Footballers from Liverpool
English footballers
Association football midfielders
Tranmere Rovers F.C. players
Manchester United F.C. players
Liverpool F.C. players
Sheffield Wednesday F.C. players
Bradford City A.F.C. players
Southport F.C. players
Vauxhall Motors F.C. players
Droylsden F.C. players
Altrincham F.C. players
Barrow A.F.C. players
Accrington Stanley F.C. players
English Football League players
National League (English football) players
Northern Premier League players
Doping cases in association football
English male criminals
English people convicted of drug offences
English prisoners and detainees
21st-century English criminals
Stalybridge Celtic F.C. players
Chester F.C. players
Warrington Rylands 1906 F.C. players
English male boxers